Appscore is an Australian-based digital agency specializing in mobile application development for iOS, Android and Windows platforms founded. Appscore has built over 600 apps for a number of companies such as Telstra, NAB, and ANZ.

History
Appscore was founded by Nick Bell and Alex Louey in 2010. The basis for establishing the company was to cater for Australia's growing demand for custom mobile solutions. During the first three years of business, Louey didn't take a salary; instead choosing to pour all profit made back into the company. In May 2016, Appscore and WME expanded their workforce in Melbourne as a centre for technology and innovation.

Appscore has more than 100 employees and currently brings in an annual turnover of $15 million, with projections that figure will increase to $25 million for 2017.

The company is driven by Alex Louey. Appscore partnership with Telstra in 2014. Company also works with global names such as Nestle, Mercedes-Benz, Apple Inc., Samsung, Microsoft and BP.

Awards
 Winner of the Gold Stevie Award 2016 in the ‘Innovation in Business Utility App’ Category

References

External links
24 Hours With… Alex Louey, co-founder and managing director, Appscore (Mumbrella)

Companies based in Melbourne
Advertising agencies of Australia
2010 establishments in Australia